Abim may refer to:

 Abim, Uganda
 Abim District, Uganda

See also

 ABIM (disambiguation)